McVeigh is an unincorporated community and coal town in Pike County, Kentucky, United States. Their post office closed in 2004.

References

Unincorporated communities in Pike County, Kentucky
Unincorporated communities in Kentucky
Coal towns in Kentucky